The Lincoln Lions are the athletic teams that represent Lincoln University, located near Oxford in Chester County, Pennsylvania, in NCAA Division II intercollegiate sports. 

The Lions compete as full members of the Central Intercollegiate Athletic Association. LU was an original member of the CIAA between 1912 and 1980 and then rejoined in 2008.

History
In the 1986-87 academic year the Lincoln University Athletic Dept. was integrated with the first white athlete.  David Sherman was recruited to play basketball from Coatesville High School in Coatesville, Pa. David Sherman played both basketball and baseball for the Lincoln Lions lettering in both sports.  He was also a Scholastic All-American for that school year with a 3.85GPA. He was nominated for the award by his basketball coach Bobby Byers.

The success of the Track and Field program led to the creation of the co-ed athletic fellowship of Track Phi Track Social Fellowship, Inc. at Lincoln in 1979. Some of the requirements include being an All-American and/or striving to become an All-American, meeting and exceeding academic requirements in your major, and participation in Lincoln's Track & Field program for four years.

Varsity teams

List of teams

Men's sports (5)
 Baseball
 Basketball
 Cross country
 Football
 Track and field

Women's sports (6)
 Basketball
 Cross country
 Softball
 Soccer
 Track and field
 Volleyball

Individual programs

Football
On , Lincoln's Board of Trustees voted to revive the football program, and establish Marching & Pep Bands. The University has petitioned for membership in the CIAA, of which Lincoln was a founding member. Lincoln will be moving from the NCAA's Division III to Division II. A club football team is scheduled for the 2008 followed with a full Division II schedule in 2009. Fielding its first football team in 48 years on August 30, 2008, Lincoln defeated George Mason University, 34–7. Lincoln lost its final nine games of 2008, but improved to 3–7 in 2009.

Men's basketball
The men's basketball team achieved a 46–12 record from 2004 to 2006. The 2005–06 season witnessed Lincoln's first national basketball ranking, led by "All American", D3 Hoops & Basketball News "National Player of the Year" Kyle Myrick. ESPN dubbed him D3's "Most Exciting Player". The Lions made the sweet sixteen for the first time in school history.

On , Lincoln's basketball team set 5 Division III records in a 201–78 victory over Ohio State Marion. Records included points scored in a half, and points scored in a game, as well as the NCAA record for margin of victory.

References

External links